The Falaq-1 missile is an Iranian made rocket system. It was developed in the 1990s by Shahid Bagheri Industrial Group, which is part of the Aerospace Industries Organization.

The 240 mm unguided surface-to-surface rocket is very similar to the rocket used with the Russian 240 mm (12-round) BM-24 system. The Falaq-1 has a bore of 240 mm, and a weight of 111 kg, with the warhead weighing 50 kg. The 240 mm spin stabilised rockets have a maximum range of 10,000 m and are fitted with a nose-mounted fuze. Propellant used is of the solid double-base type. The rocket is mounted on a 4 × 4 jeep light cross-country vehicle which has six 240 mm rockets in the ready-to-launch position in a frame type launcher on the rear.

The Falaq-1 has a maximum range of 10 km. It weighs 111 kg and carries a 50 kg explosive warhead. Its successor, the Falaq-2, is a 333 mm-diameter rocket. It weighs 255 kg with a 120 kg warhead that holds 60 kg of explosives.

There is extensive evidence Falaq-1 rockets have been used in the Syrian civil war.

Operators
 
 
 Hezbollah

See also
 Falaq-2

References 

Falaq 1
Hezbollah rocket systems
Military equipment introduced in the 1990s